The Hope Haynes was a ship notable for causing a massive fire and gas explosion in Bridgeport, Connecticut in 1905.

Ship information
The schooner Hope Haynes was a wooden three masted type, home ported in Bath, Maine.

1905 Bridgeport incident
The Hope Haynes was torn from her moorings and smashed into the Congress Street Bridge, tearing out electrical wiring and thus setting a fire which spread to and ignited a broken gas main. There was a large explosion and the ship also caught on fire, but was soon put out.

Later service
The ship was rebuilt in 1908 in Mystic, Connecticut was renamed Mystic in 1916 when it was sold for $12,000 to a Captain Mueller for use as a cargo ship to Cape de Verde.

References

History of Bridgeport, Connecticut
Fires in Connecticut
Mystic, Connecticut
Individual sailing vessels
1880 ships